André Carvalho (born 31 October 1997) is a Portuguese professional racing cyclist, who currently rides for UCI WorldTeam .

Major results
2014
 1st  Road race, National Junior Road Championships
2015
 1st  Road race, National Junior Road Championships
2017
 National Under–23 Road Championships
2nd Road race
8th Time trial
2018
 3rd Road race, National Under–23 Road Championships
2019
 4th Road race, National Under–23 Road Championships
 5th Liège–Bastogne–Liège U23
 5th Paris–Roubaix Espoirs
 9th Grote Prijs Jef Scherens
2020
 10th Grand Prix d'Isbergues

References

External links
 

1997 births
Living people
Portuguese male cyclists
Competitors at the 2018 Mediterranean Games
Mediterranean Games competitors for Portugal
People from Vila Nova de Famalicão
Sportspeople from Braga District